is a Japanese football player. He plays for Nara Club.

Club statistics
Updated to 2 January 2020.

References

External links

Profile at Nara Club
j-league

1985 births
Living people
Hosei University alumni
Association football people from Kanagawa Prefecture
Japanese footballers
J2 League players
J3 League players
Japan Football League players
Tochigi SC players
Tokyo Verdy players
AC Nagano Parceiro players
FC Machida Zelvia players
Nara Club players
Association football midfielders